Beaufortia raggedensis, commonly known as Mount Ragged beaufortia, is a plant in the myrtle family, Myrtaceae and is endemic to the southwest of Western Australia. It is a compact shrub with densely clustered leaves and large heads of deep red flowers in spring and only occurs near Mount Arid in the Cape Arid National Park.

Description
They often have a covering of fine hairs, giving them a greyish appearance.

The flowers are deep red and are arranged in heads on the ends of branches. The flowers have 5 sepals, 5 petals and 5 bundles of stamens.

Taxonomy and naming
Melaleuca raggedensis was first formally described in 2016 by Andrew A. Burbidge and the description was published in Nuytsia. The specific epithet ("raggedensis") refers to the Mount Ragged, near which this species is found.

Distribution and habitat
Beaufortia raggedensis grows in quartzite, only on the slopes and bases of mountains of the Russell Range in the Cape Arid National Park, Mallee bioregion.

Conservation
Beaufortia raggedensis is classified as "Priority Two" by the Western Australian Government Department of Biodiversity, Conservation and Attractions, meaning that it is poorly known and from only one or a few locations.

References

raggedensis
Plants described in 2016
Endemic flora of Western Australia